The 2019 Ju-Jitsu World Championship were the 17th edition of the Ju-Jitsu World Championships, and were held in Abu Dhabi, United Arab Emirates from November 20 to November 23, 2019.

Schedule 
20.11.2019 – Men's Fighting System, Men's and Women's Duo System – Classic, Mixed Duo System – Show, Women's Jiu-Jitsu
21.11.2019 – Men's and Women's Fighting System, Men's and Women's Duo System – Show, Mixed Duo System – Classic
22.11.2019 – Men's Jiu-Jitsu
23.11.2019 – Men's Jiu-Jitsu, Team event

European Ju-Jitsu

Fighting System

Men's events

Women's events

Duo System

Duo Classic events

Duo Show events

Brazilian Jiu-Jitsu

Men's events

Women's events

Team event

Links

References

External links
Online Results